Vivek Chaand Sehgal (born 1 February 1957) is an Indian-Australian billionaire businessman and entrepreneur. Sehgal is the chairman and co-founder of Samvardhana Motherson Group, an auto parts manufacturer.

Early life
Sehgal was born on 1 February 1957 in Delhi, India. He did his schooling from Birla Public School in Pilani, Rajasthan. Sehgal earned a bachelor's degree from the University of Delhi.

Career
Sehgal’s grandfather was a well-known jeweller. In 1975 Sehgal co-founded Samvardhana Motherson Group with his mother, and entered the silver trade. Samvardhana Motherson Group's future in the silver industry was placed in jeopardy after a competitor faced bankruptcy. Samvardhana Motherson Group became a manufacturer of auto components instead, eventually forming a partnership with Sumitomo Electric and acquired eleven companies in twelve years. Sehgal served as managing director from 1975 until 1995 and stepped back from the day-to-day operations of the business, and has subsequently served as chairman of the group.

In 2016 Sehgal was awarded the EY Entrepreneur of the Year Award, India.

Personal life
Seghal is married, with two children, and lives in Delhi, India.

Net worth 
As of May 2021, Financial Review Rich List estimated Seghal's net worth was 4.76 billion. Meanwhile, Forbes estimated his net worth was 3.7 billion in the same month.

References 

Businesspeople from Delhi
Living people
1957 births
Australian billionaires
Delhi University alumni
Indian emigrants to Australia
Naturalised citizens of Australia